Tan Jian (born March 1965) is a Chinese diplomat currently serving as . Previously he served as Chinese Ambassador to Ethiopia.

Biography
Tan was born in March 1965. He attended the Nanjing Foreign Language School. He joined the Foreign Service in 1987 and has served various diplomatic positions including attaché, secretary, and counsellor. In 2012 he was promoted to become counsellor and deputy director of the Department of International Economic Affairs, a position he held until 2017. On December 14, 2017, President Xi Jinping appointed him Chinese Ambassador to Ethiopia, a post in which he served from December 2017 to September 2020. On January 5, 2021, he was appointed , replacing .

Personal life
Tan is married and has a son.

References

1965 births
Living people
Ambassadors of China to Ethiopia
Ambassadors of China to the Netherlands
Place of birth missing (living people)